A.J. Freiman Limited, or Freimans, was a landmark department store at 73 Rideau Street in Ottawa, Ontario, Canada, founded in 1918 by Archibald J. Freiman.

Archibald Jacob Freiman was born in Lithuania in 1880, and emigrated to Hamilton, Ontario. Freimans rose to become the most successful department store in Ottawa because of its prominent location at Mosgrove and Rideau Streets, its aggressive marketing and its low prices. The company also operated stores in Westgate and St. Laurent Shopping Centres, as well as discount stores called Freimart in Shoppers City West and Shoppers City East.

Then owned by A.J. Freiman's son, Lawrence (who wrote a book about the store), Hudson's Bay Company acquired the company in 1972 and rebranded to The Bay in 1973.  The former Freimans store still operates as a retail store of The Bay, and an adjoining arcade linking Rideau Street to the Byward Market is named the Freiman Mall in honour of the longtime Ottawa retailer. In addition, the laneway around the north side of the nearby National Arts Centre which provides access to the box office has been named Lawrence Freiman Lane.

Freimans was also the centre of an important battle against anti-semitism. In the 1930s, Ottawa police officer Jean Tissot, affiliated with Adrien Arcand's fascist movement, attempted to rally Christian Canadians to boycott Jewish businesses. Freimans, as the most prominent Jewish owned business in Ottawa was at the centre of his attacks. As a result, Freiman filed suit against Tissot, who was subsequently found guilty of criminal libel. The staunch condemnations of Tissot in the mainstream press and the utter failure of his movement to find support among the people led to a sound defeat for anti-semitism in Ottawa.

See also
List of Canadian department stores
Ogilvy's
Murphy-Gamble
Caplan's

Notes

References

External links 
 A.J. Freiman Limited fonds(R3487) at Library and Archives Canada
 Freiman family fonds (R6882)) at Library and Archives Canada

Department stores of Canada
Buildings and structures in Ottawa
Companies based in Ottawa
Defunct retail companies of Canada
Shops in Ottawa
Privately held companies of Canada
Hudson's Bay Company
1918 establishments in Ontario